The men's hammer throw event at the 1994 Commonwealth Games was held at the Centennial Stadium in Victoria, British Columbia.

Results

References

Hammer
1994